The 1951 NCAA basketball tournament involved 16 schools playing in single-elimination play to determine the national champion of men's NCAA Division I college basketball. It began on March 20, 1951, and ended with the championship game on March 27 at Williams Arena in Minneapolis, Minnesota. A total of 18 games were played, including a third place game in each region and a national third place game.

Kentucky, coached by Adolph Rupp, won the national title with a 68–58 victory over Kansas State, coached by Jack Gardner.

This NCAA tournament was the first with a 16-team field. Only the championship and third place games were held in Minneapolis, while the semifinals were held in the respective regional sites; similar to previous years. A true "Final Four" (semifinals and final at same location) debuted the following year.

The twelve-team National Invitation Tournament (NIT) was held the previous week in New York City at Madison Square Garden, with its championship on Saturday, March 17. Four teams competed in both tournaments, including NIT champion  they lost in the quarterfinal round, by ten points to 

The three other teams were Arizona, North Carolina State, and St. John's.

Locations
The following are the sites selected to host each round of the 1951 tournament:

First round

March 20
Madison Square Garden, New York, New York
Reynolds Coliseum, Raleigh, North Carolina
March 21 and 22
Municipal Auditorium, Kansas City, Missouri

Regionals

March 22 and 24
East Regional, Madison Square Garden, New York, New York
March 23 and 24
West Regional, Municipal Auditorium, Kansas City, Missouri

Championship Game

March 27
Williams Arena, Minneapolis, Minnesota

Teams

Bracket

National Third Place Game

Regional third place games

See also
 1951 National Invitation Tournament
 1951 NAIA Division I men's basketball tournament

References

NCAA Division I men's basketball tournament
NCAA
NCAA  Basketball Tournament
NCAA basketball tournament